Vutov is a Bulgarian surname. Notable people with the surname include:

Antonio Vutov (born 1996), Bulgarian footballer
Ivan Vutov (born 1944), Bulgarian football manager and player
Vitomir Vutov (born 1971), Bulgarian footballer and coach

Bulgarian-language surnames